Wonderful Virus is the debut album by post-grunge group Green Apple Quick Step. It was released in 1993 on the Medicine label. The album was produced by Daniel Rey.

Medicine released the single "Ludes and Cherrybombs" as a promotional CD in Europe in 1993, containing the album version, a version remixed by Martin Feveyear, and an edited version of that remix.  The single was also released as a limited edition 7" purple vinyl in the UK in 1994, with the Feveyear remix on one side and the other side containing an acoustic version of "Feel My Way", as well as a track called "The Unheard Music".  Both B-side tracks were recorded by John Goodmanson, mixed by Phil Ek, and produced by Green Apple Quick Step and Martin Feveyear.

Critical reception
Trouser Press wrote that "Ty Willman is an inoffensively functional vocalist and the lyrics use more big words than Eddie Vedder, but anyone looking for originality or effective musical excitement would do better turning up other rocks."

Track listing
All songs by Green Apple Quick Step

Personnel
Green Apple Quick Step
 Tyler Willman – vocals
 Steve Ross – guitar
 Daniel Kempthorne – guitar
 Mari Ann Braeden – bass, vocals
 Bob Martin – drums

Production personnel
 Daniel Rey – production
 Ed Brooks – engineering
 Ron Saint Germain – mixing
 Bob Ludwig – mastering

References

1993 debut albums
Green Apple Quick Step albums
Albums produced by Daniel Rey